Pierre-Yves Jorand (born 20 May 1963) is a Swiss speed skier and sailor who has competed at multiple America's Cups.

Jorand joined North Sails Switzerland in 1984. Jorand was also a speed skier and was European champion. In 1984, he was the first skier to go faster than 200 km/h. He then represented Switzerland at the 1992 Winter Olympics, where he competed in the speed skiing event, which was a demonstration sport. On the morning of the finals, Jorand was warming up with a fellow competitor, Nicolas Bochatay, when Bochatay crashed into a snowmobile and died instantly.

He joined Alinghi and was their technical coach at the 2003 and 2007 America's Cups. He was then a main trimmer on the catamaran Alinghi 5 during the 2010 America's Cup. Since then, he has sailed with Alinghi in the Extreme Sailing Series.

In 2014 he joined the sailing selection committee for the Swiss Olympic Association.

References

Speed skiers at the 1992 Winter Olympics
1963 births
Living people
Swiss male sailors (sport)
Swiss male alpine skiers
Alinghi sailors
2010 America's Cup sailors
Extreme Sailing Series sailors
Winter Olympics competitors for Switzerland
20th-century Swiss people